The Classical Heisenberg model, developed by Werner Heisenberg, is the  case of the n-vector model, one of the models used in statistical physics to model ferromagnetism, and other phenomena.

Definition
It can be formulated as follows: take a d-dimensional lattice, and a set of spins of the unit length

,

each one placed on a lattice node.

The model is defined through the following Hamiltonian:
 
with
 

a coupling between spins.

Properties
 The general mathematical formalism used to describe and solve the Heisenberg model and certain generalizations is developed in the article on the Potts model.
 In the continuum limit the Heisenberg model (2) gives the following equation of motion
 
This equation is called the continuous classical Heisenberg ferromagnet equation or shortly Heisenberg model and is integrable in the sense of soliton theory. It admits several integrable and nonintegrable generalizations like Landau-Lifshitz equation, Ishimori equation and so on.

One dimension
In case of long range interaction, the thermodynamic limit is well defined if  ; the magnetization remains zero if ; but the magnetization is positive, at low enough temperature, if   (infrared bounds).
As in any 'nearest-neighbor' n-vector model with free boundary conditions, if the external field is zero, there exists a simple exact solution.

Two dimensions
 In  the case of long-range interaction, the thermodynamic limit is well defined if ; the magnetization remains zero if ; but the magnetization is positive at low enough temperature if   (infrared bounds).
 Polyakov has conjectured that, as opposed to the classical XY model, there is no dipole phase for any ; i.e. at non-zero temperature the correlations cluster exponentially fast.

Three and higher dimensions
Independently of the range of the interaction, at low enough temperature the magnetization is positive.

Conjecturally, in each of the low temperature  extremal states the truncated correlations decay algebraically.

See also
 Heisenberg model (quantum)
 Ising model
 Classical XY model
 Magnetism
 Ferromagnetism
 Landau–Lifshitz equation
 Ishimori equation

References

External links
 Absence of Ferromagnetism or Antiferromagnetism in One- or Two-Dimensional Isotropic Heisenberg Models 
  The Heisenberg Model - a Bibliography
  Monte-Carlo simulation of the Heisenberg, XY and Ising models with 3D graphics (requires WebGL compatible browser)

Magnetic ordering
Spin models
Lattice models
Werner Heisenberg